Gabrielle Hamilton may refer to:

 Gabrielle Hamilton (actress) (1923–2014), British actress
 Gabrielle Hamilton (chef) (born 1966), American chef and author